Lita Cabellut (born 1961 in Sariñena, Aragon) is a Spanish multidisciplinary artist who lives and works in The Hague, Netherlands. Cabellut works on large scale canvases using a contemporary variation of the fresco technique.

Early life and influences
Born in a village in Aragon, Cabellut moved to Barcelona as a child where her mother ran a brothel. She was left under the care of her grandmother but spent most of her days on the streets selling 'imaginary stars'. When her grandmother died, Cabellut went to live in an orphanage. At the age of twelve Lita was adopted by a Catalan family. During this new period she discovered the Prado Museum and became inspired by the paintings of Goya, Velázquez, Ribera and Rembrandt.

Lita Cabellut moved to the Netherlands at the age of 19 to pursue her studies at the Gerrit Rietveld Academy in Amsterdam, where she studied between 1982 and 1984. During these years her work would be influenced by the Dutch masters and she developed some of the artist techniques that have become her distinguishing mark.

Work

Art techniques 
Working on large-scale canvases, Spanish artist Lita Cabellut has developed a contemporary variation of the classic fresco technique and a recognizable personal palette style that comes from her obsession to provide her characters with a skin.  However, beyond her most recognized works and techniques Cabellut is a multi-disciplinary artist whose works also include: drawings on paper, sculptures, photography, scenography, installations, poetry, visual poems and videos.

Collections 
Lita Cabellut's work is grouped conceptually in collections or series of paintings. The collection “Frida, The Black Pearl” (2010) pays tribute to Mexican artist Frida Kahlo, in which Cabellut depicts Kahlo’s life while including many of her own experiences. This series inspired Cabellut to create “Coco, The Testimony of Black and White” (2011), a collection that portrays this fashion icon through 35 large-scale portraits. “A Portrait of Human knowledge” (2012) continues Cabellut’s previous work with portraits of some of the most influential icons of knowledge from the past 150 years, including Stravinsky, Nureyev, Marie Curie, Billie Holiday, Federico Garcia Lorca, Rudolf Steiner and Sigmund Freud.

With “The Trilogy of the Doubt”, a collection composed by socially inspired triptych paintings about power, injustice and ignorance, Cabellut received attention both in her native Spain in The Netherlands. The portrait collection “Dried Tear” (2013) expresses Cabellut’s fascination and admiration for Asian culture. Cabellut’s series about the Dutch Golden Age entitled “The Black Tulip” (2014) was inspired by one of the most famous national symbols of the Netherlands.

For her latest collection “Blind Mirror” (2015), Cabellut explored culture and religion, focusing on some of the most influential religions that have been known to humanity.

The innovative series A Chronicle of the Infinite (2018) addresses the effects of time and experience on the process of human transformation. This series mostly consists of triptychs, with one of the three being a human portrait; the second an abstract work; and, the last piece, a destruction of the figurative portrait.

Exhibitions

Since her first exhibition at the Town Hall of El Masnou, Barcelona, in 1978, Cabellut's work has been exhibited all around the world, including New York, Dubai, Miami, Singapore, Hong Kong, Barcelona, London, Paris, Venice, Monaco and Seoul.

Some of her solo museum exhibitions include: 

 2020 - Black Tulip, Museum de Zwarte Tulp, Lisse, The Netherlands
 2019 - The Victory of Silence, Goya Museum, Zaragoza, Spain
 2018 - A Chronicle of the Infinite, Museum Jan van der Togt, Amstelveen, The Netherlands
 2017 - Testimonio, Museo de Arte Contemporáneo Gas Natural Fenosa, Coruña, Spain
 2017 - Retrospectiva, Espais Volart, Fundació Vila Casas, Barcelona, Spain
 2015 - Black Tulip: The Golden Age, CSMVS (formally the Prince of Wales Museum), Bombay, India
 2015 - Black Tulip: The Golden Age, Lalit Kala A kademi, New Delhi, India
2015 - Blind Mirror, Hälsingland Museum, Hudiksvall, Sweden.
 2014 - Here to Stay, Kunststation Kleinsassen, Berlin, Germany
 2013 - Trilogy of Doubt, NoordBrabants Museum, Den Bosch, The Netherlands
 2013 - La trilogia de la Duda, Espai Volart, Fundació Vila Casas, Barcelona, Spain

Awards and recognition

 On 8 April 2011 Lita was awarded with the “Premio de Cultura Gitana de Pintura y Artes Plásticas” (Gypsy Culture Award for Paint and Plastic Arts) by “Instituto de Cultura Gitana” (Institute of Gypsy Culture) in recognition to the work done in benefit of this group’s culture anywhere in the world.
 In 2015, the magazine Artprice gave the artist the 333rd position in the "top 500" of the most famous contemporary artists in the world. With this, Lita Cabellut was recognized as the most well known Spanish female artist.
 In March 2015, Lita was invited to be part of the jury of the 'Premios Figurativas por la Fundació Privada de les Arts i els Artistes', an annual artistic prize dedicated to promoting figurative art.
 In 2017, Cabellut was awarded the 'IX Premio Time-Out Barcelona' for her contribution to the promotion of the city of Barcelona through her much-visited retrospective exhibition at the Fundació Vila Casas.
 In 2018, Cabellut received the ‘Fuera de serie’ de las Artes Award in Madrid. 
 In 2020, Cabellut has been chosen as the Artist of the Year 2021 in The Netherlands.

References

External links
 Lita Cabellut’s website: http://www.litacabellut.com
 Lita Cabellut, Opera Gallery: http://www.operagallery.com/ang/artist/lita-cabellut

1961 births
Living people
20th-century Spanish women artists
21st-century Spanish women artists
20th-century Spanish painters
21st-century Spanish painters
Spanish Romani people
Spanish women painters